is a professional Japanese baseball player. He plays outfielder for the Tokyo Yakult Swallows.

References 

1993 births
Living people
Baseball people from Kanagawa Prefecture
Teikyo University alumni
Japanese baseball players
Nippon Professional Baseball outfielders
Tokyo Yakult Swallows players